FC Avangard Bziv is an amateur Ukrainian football from Bziv, Brovary Raion.

History 
The club was created in 2015.

Notable Player
  Andriy Smalko

Honours 
 Ukrainian Amateur Cup
 Winners (1): 2018–19
 Kyiv Oblast Championship
 Winners (2): 2017, 2018
 Kyiv Oblast Cup
 Runners-up (1): 2017

References 

Association football clubs established in 2015
2015 establishments in Ukraine
Football clubs in Kyiv Oblast
Amateur football clubs in Ukraine
Brovary Raion
FC Avanhard Bziv